Buckley House may refer to:

in the United States
(by state)
Buckley Ranch, Hartsel, CO, listed on the NRHP in Colorado
Buckley Homestead, Lowell, IN, listed on the NRHP in Indiana
Judge John L. Buckley House, Enterprise, MS, listed on the NRHP in Mississippi
McCrory-Deas-Buckley House, Enterprise, MS, listed on the NRHP in Mississippi
Smith-McClain-Buckley House, Enterprise, MS, listed on the NRHP in Mississippi
Buckley House (New Hebron, Mississippi), listed on the NRHP in Mississippi
James Buckley House, Cape Vincent, NY, listed on the NRHP in New York
Anthony-Buckley House, La Grande, OR, listed on the NRHP in Oregon
Patrick J. Buckley House, Waukesha, WI, listed on the NRHP in Wisconsin